The Rural City of Benalla is a local government area in the Hume region of Victoria, Australia, located in the north-east part of the state.

It includes the towns of Baddaginnie, Benalla, Devenish, Goorambat, Major Plains, Swanpool, Tatong, Thoona, Warrenbayne and Winton. It was formed in 2002 from the de-amalgamation of the Shire of Delatite into the current rural city and the Shire of Mansfield, the former being a merger between the latter, the Shire of Benalla and the City of Benalla.

The Rural City is governed and administered by the Benalla Rural City Council; its seat of local government and administrative centre is located at the council headquarters in Benalla. The Rural City is named after the main urban settlement located in the centre-north of the LGA, that is Benalla, which is also the LGA's most populous urban centre with a population of 10,331.

Council

Current composition
The council is composed of seven councillors elected to represent an unsubdivided municipality.

Administration and governance
The council meets in the council chambers at the council headquarters in the Benalla Municipal Offices, which is also the location of the council's administrative activities. It also provides customer services at its administrative centre in Benalla.

Townships and localities
The 2021 census, the rural city had a population of 14,528 up from 13,861 in the 2016 census

^ - Territory divided with another LGA

See also
 List of localities (Victoria)
 List of places on the Victorian Heritage Register in the Rural City of Benalla

References

External links
Benalla Rural City Council official website
Metlink local public transport map
Link to Land Victoria interactive maps

Local government areas of Victoria (Australia)
Hume (region)
 
Hume Highway